Peyman Ghane (born June 23, 1980) is an Iranian scenic designer and decorator of some popular television shows on IRIB.
He was awarded the best design award for the scenic design of Koodak Show at the fourth and fifth Jam-e-Jam Television Festival.

Works
 Dorehami
 Mah-e Asal
 Khandevane
 The Monster
 Koodak Show
 Dast Farmoon (Steering Skills)
 Sime Akhar
 Iranish
 Mesle Maah (Like Moon)
 Tab Taab
 Haft (Seven)
 Khat-e Sevvom (The Third Line)
 Dastkhat (Handwriting)
 Se Setareh (Three Stars)

References

Iranian scenic designers
1980 births
Living people
People from Mashhad